Espasante is a fishing port in the Ferrolterra borough of Ortigueira in North-western Spain. From this port, which is near the Ria of Ortigueira and the fishing port of Cariño, trawlers leave to fish for tuna, cod, haddock and other seafood.

 Fishing port
 Sport port

External links 
 Entry for the Port of Espasante in the Web of Casas Cantabricas: a web-site devoted to the North-west of Spain and Portugal

Port cities and towns on the Spanish Atlantic coast